Sergokalinsky District is an administrative and municipal district (raion), one of the forty-one in the Republic of Dagestan, Russia. It is located in the east of the republic. Its administrative center is the rural locality (a selo) of Sergokala. As of the 2010 Census, the total population of the district was 27,133, with the population of Sergokala accounting for 30.0% of that number.

Administrative and municipal status
Within the framework of administrative divisions, Sergokalinsky District is one of the forty-one in the Republic of Dagestan. The district is divided into ten selsoviets which comprise thirty-five rural localities. As a municipal division, the district is incorporated as Sergokalinsky Municipal District. Its ten selsoviets are incorporated as fifteen rural settlements within the municipal district. The selo of Sergokala serves as the administrative center of both the administrative and municipal district.

References

Notes

Sources

Districts of Dagestan